Sandeep Kumar  Shukla is currently Poonam and Prabhu Goel Chair Professor and previous head of Computer Science and Engineering Department, Indian Institute of Technology, Kanpur, India. He is currently the Editor-in-Chief of ACM Transactions on Embedded Systems, and associate editor for ACM transactions on Cyber Physical Systems. He is currently the joint director of C3i centre at IIT Kanpur along with Manindra Agrawal.

Shukla obtained his B.E. degree from Jadavpur University in 1991. After graduation, he immigrated to the United States where he attended University at Albany, SUNY for three years. When he graduated from it with an M.S. degree he got enrolled into its Ph.D. program, completing it in 1997.

He was a faculty at the Virginia Tech, Arlington, Virginia between 2002 and 2015. In 2014, he was named Fellow of the Institute of Electrical and Electronics Engineers (IEEE) "for contributions to applied probablistic model checking for system design".

Bibliography
Nano, Quantum and Molecular Computing Implications to High Level Design and Validation, Springer Publishing, 2004, 
Formal Methods and Models for System Design A System Level Perspective, Springer Publishing, 2004, 
SystemC Kernel Extensions for Heterogeneous System Modeling A Framework for Multi-MoC Modeling & Simulation, Springer Publishing, 2004, 
Ingredients for Successful System Level Design Methodology, Springer Publishing, 2008, 
Fundamental Problems in Computing, Springer Publishing, 2009, 
Metamodeling-Driven IP Reuse for SoC Integration and Microprocessor Design, Artech House Publishing, 2009, 
Synthesis of Embedded Software, Springer Publishing, 2010, 
Low Power Hardware Synthesis from Concurrent Action-Oriented Specifications, Springer Publishing, 2010, 
Low Power Design with High-Level Power Estimation and Power-Aware Synthesis, Springer Publishing, 2012, 
Parallelizing High Level Synthesis, G. Singh, Sumit Gupta, Sandeep Shukla, Rajesh K. Gupta, The CRC Handbook of EDA for IC Design, Edited by Grant Martin, Luciano Lavagno, and Lou Scheffer
An Introductory Survey of Networked Embedded Systems, H. Patel, Sumit Gupta, Sandeep Shukla, Rajesh K. Gupta, The Industrial Information Technology Handbook, edited by Richard Zurawski, CRC Press, 2003.
Design Issues for Networked Embedded Systems, Sumit Gupta, H. Patel, Sandeep Shukla, Rajesh K. Gupta, The Embedded Systems Handbook

References

External links

20th-century births
Living people
Indian computer scientists
Jadavpur University alumni
University at Albany, SUNY alumni
Virginia Tech faculty
Fellow Members of the IEEE
Distinguished Members of the ACM
Year of birth missing (living people)
Place of birth missing (living people)